Lenora is an unincorporated community in Dewey County, Oklahoma, United States. It is located 5.5 miles west of Taloga.

History
The community was founded in 1892 and had a population of 400 in 1900. A post office operated in Lenora from March 24, 1896 to June 30, 1955.

References

Unincorporated communities in Dewey County, Oklahoma
Unincorporated communities in Oklahoma